"Peppermint Twist" is a song written by Joey Dee and Henry Glover, recorded and released by Joey Dee and the Starliters in 1961.  Capitalizing on the Twist dance craze and the nightclub in which Dee performed ("The Peppermint Lounge"), the song hit No.1 on the U.S. Billboard Hot 100 in early 1962. The original recording of the song was considered too long for release on a 45 rpm single, so it was split into two parts. It was this first part, "Peppermint Twist (Part 1)", with a length of 2:03, which became the No.1 hit; the mostly instrumental second half of the recording is rarely heard today.

"Peppermint Twist" replaced Chubby Checker's "The Twist", the song that sparked the Twist fad, at the No. 1 position.

Background
The lead singer in the Starliters' version is David Brigati, whose brother, Eddie Brigati, was a singer for the 1960s pop group the (Young) Rascals. The other personnel on the record included Carlton Lattimore on organ, Billy Butler on guitar, Jerome Richardson on sax, and Don Martin on drums.

Chart performance

All-time charts

The Sweet version
The song was covered by English glam rock band Sweet and was included on their album Sweet Fanny Adams. In Australia, the single reached No. 4 on the weekly chart and No. 26 on the 1975 year end chart.

See also
Twist songs

References

1961 songs
1961 singles
1962 singles
1974 singles
Bill Haley songs
Caterina Valente songs
The Sweet songs
Billboard Hot 100 number-one singles
Number-one singles in Australia
Songs written by Henry Glover
Roulette Records singles
RCA Records singles
Twist (dance)
Songs about dancing